Death Locket (Rebecca Ryker) is a fictional character appearing in American comic books published by Marvel Comics.

Publication history
Death Locket first appeared in issue #1 of the Avengers Arena series as part of the Marvel NOW! event, and was created by Dennis Hopeless and Kev Walker.

Death Locket appears as one of the main characters in Avengers Undercover beginning in 2014.

Fictional character biography
A female teenage version of Deathlok is one of sixteen teenagers kidnapped by Arcade who forces them to fight each other to the death in his latest version of Murderworld. As the games in Murderworld begin, she faces off against Hazmat and then fights Cammi soon after. Cammi gives her the nickname Death Locket. Throughout the first day, Death Locket remembers the past events that led to her origins. She is revealed to be Rebecca Ryker, the daughter of Harlan Ryker. After being maimed in an explosion that killed her mother and brother, Rebecca was rebuilt using the Deathlok technology that her father developed. She joins the Braddock Academy group (consisting of Apex, Kid Briton, Anachronism, Bloodstone and Nara). Juston is attacked by an unidentified cybernetic creature and the Sentinel he is working on folds around him apparently crushing him.

An earthquake separates Bloodstone and Anachronism from Apex, Nara, Kid Briton, and Death Locket. An injured Reptil wakes up and clears Chase's reputation, saying that Death Locket was the one who attacked him. Meanwhile, Rebecca goes dormant as her Death Locket cybernetics take over and she blasts Nara off a cliff and into the ocean. Kid Briton is enraged by this and tries to kill her until Apex orders him not to. Nara, Anachronism, and Bloodstone manage to survive falling into the chasm and come to the conclusion that Apex is manipulating Death Locket and Kid Briton to her own ends. Nara and Apex later start arguing and Apex confirms that she was the one who ordered Death Locket to attack Nara. Juston Seyfert is revealed to have survived the attack from the cybernetic creature, but is now paralyzed below the waist due to the injuries sustained when the Sentinel crashed. Distraught at the loss of his best friend, Juston salvages the remains of the Sentinel and creates a suit of battle armor which he uses to attack Death Locket. Apex uses Death Locket to help her kill Nico. After the Staff of One resurrects Nico, she disassembles Death Locket's cybernetic arm, and traps her and Apex underground. Death Locket explores the facility she and Apex end up in. Apex's brother Tim repairs Death Locket's arm, giving her a new cannon, and she unleashes Chris Powell, the original Darkhawk, to attack Arcade. Arcade soon escapes and talks Apex into finishing the game. She regains control of Death Locket and uses her to blast Chris. Apex unleashes bugs, sentient typhoon, and weaponized sand to attack the remaining teens on Murderworld. Tim soon breaks Death Locket free, and she becomes enraged enough to attack Apex. Apex soon reverts to Tim and asks Death Locket to shoot him, thereby stopping the games. She is shocked at first, but soon complies, and everyone is able to escape Murderworld and disperse.

Avengers Undercover
Once news broke about Arcade's kidnappings, Death Locket and the other Murder World Survivors became infamous. Death Locket was the subject of S.H.I.E.L.D. agents gushing over her actions in the Arena, which was something she did not appreciate. However, when Anachronism reveals Bloodstone's gone missing, all the survivors team up to head to Bagalia to find him. On their way in, Death Locket reveals that she really doesn't know how to fight, but Hazmat encourages her to use her gun and then congratulates her on how well it worked. Once they find Bloodstone, he reveals that he enjoys life among the villains, and the others, minus Cammi, start to enjoy it as well. Death Locket even gets hit on by Excavator of the Wrecking Crew. When Cammi tries to tell the others to leave, Bloodstone instead has Daimon Hellstrom teleport the group to Arcade's latest party so they can kill him. While at the party, Death Locket escorts Cullen and Nico to take down Arcade's computers and stop his powers so the group can fight him. They succeed and beat up Arcade before Hazmat kills him with a large radiation blast. After escaping the mansion, the group is captured by S.H.I.E.L.D., but are soon "rescued" by Daimon Hellstorm. The Son of Satan brings the group before Baron Zemo who offers the group a chance to join his forces. While taking the tour of Bagalia given by Constrictor, Becca and Chase find themselves bonding with the Young Masters. Once again, Becca finds herself bonding with Excavator. The rest of the group meets up while Becca is hanging out with the Young Masters. Every member of the group, with the exception of Cammi, accepts Baron Zemo's offer. While playing games with Excavator and the Young Masters, which include firing laser guns at each other during kart races, Chase tries to get Death Locket alone, saying he has been trying to do so for a week. Before Chase can tell her a secret, an alarm sounds and the Young Masters are called into action. The group battles A.I.M. on A.I.M. Island. She begins to enjoy combat, thinking of it as a game. Death Locket sees Captain America land a Quinjet in the battle. Excavator encourages her to shoot Captain America in the back. Chase intervenes and saves the captain's life and attacks Excavator. He informs Becca that the group never really joined the Masters of Evil and have infiltrated the group to try and take them down from the inside. As Excavator and Chase battle, they tell Death Locket to pick a side, and in a state of panic she fires and shoots Chase in the chest. When returning to Bagalia, Death Locket lies to the group saying Chase was injured in combat. He is left comatose. Over the span of three months, Death Locket embraced being part of the Young Masters. Getting a new costume, haircut, and a number of piercings on her right ear and eyebrow. She is enjoying battling the forces of S.H.I.E.L.D. Hazmat tries to secretly contact Becca, who reveals she knew the truth of the undercover team. She, and the other Young Masters, ambush Hazmat, but were defeated. Death Locket joins with the forces of Bagalia to fight the number of superheroes who came to rescue the team and confront Baron Zemo. Baron Zemo, Madame Masque, Constrictor, Daimon Hellstrom, and Death Locket teleport onto the S.H.I.E.L.D. Hellicarrier Circe. The Baron has Death Locket use her powers to crack the helicarrier's guidance system and fly them out, which she easily achieves. After gaining control of the helicarrier, she hacked into S.H.I.E.L.D.'s communication network, which gave Baron Zemo access to every television, phone, computer, and tablet in the world. When confronted by Cammi, now using Arcade's God Mode technology from Murderworld, Death Locket surrenders. She escapes with the Masters of Evil and is last seen as the pilot of their airship.

War of the Realms: Journey into Mystery
Rebecca would be seen again at the helicarrier she had downed back in her Young Masters days. While there, she had a mock party with numerous LMDs styled after various influential individuals like her father, Dum Dum Dugan and Natasha Romanova as well as several teens whom she had pretend were her family. The last Norn Witch led Balder the Brave to seek out warriors who would aid in protecting his newest baby sister, Laussa Odinsdottir, from the forces of Sindr backed by Malekith's invading armies, who were sweeping across Midgard.

Rebecca and her new crew, called the Babysitter's Club, trekked across northern America in an effort to elude the recently resurrected war god, Ares, who had been contracted by Sindr, the queen of Muspelheim, to dispose of Odin and Freya's offspring due to the threat Laussa posed to her throne. Save for Thori, the heroic cadre didn't realize Laussa was actually a receptacle for the demonic fire giant Surtur's dark power.

While on their cross-country road trip, Thori speculated that the youngest daughter of the house of Odin had been instinctively guiding her protectors and influencing their actions at certain points along the way for an as yet unknown purpose (i.e., guiding them towards an encampment populated by Skrulls who were remnants left behind after Secret Invasion). The encampment was an abandoned Old West theme park inhabited by ghosts and apparitions headed by a former Sorcerer Supreme, Kushala. Arriving at a comic convention-like gathering for the henchmen of super-villains, Death Locket preached about a plan to clean out Henchmen Con by clocking into the networked slot machines, until one of the lackey sects managed to finger Hawkeye and a riot broke out.

All of this culminated in an epic final battle with the grieving Ares after he had managed to kidnap Laussa. The god of war participated in Sindr's scheme only in order to die a warrior's death so he could be reunited with his son in the Elysium. But Sebastian Druid and others manage convinced him otherwise, insisting he should instead help them stop the War of Realms with the army they had inadvertently gathered.

Powers and abilities
Her left arm can transform into a powerful ray-gun. She is vulnerable to control by Apex's technopathy, and also may generally lack control over her abilities. It is not yet revealed whether she has cybernetic uplink and other Deathlok abilities, but she was able to shut down Arcade's complex computer systems. She is seen struggling to use her cybernetic uplink to take control of the computer systems in Arcade's mansion. After several months, she has gotten better with her uplink and is able to take over a S.H.I.E.L.D. Helicarrier and pilot it single-handed, and hack into S.H.I.E.L.D.'s worldwide communication network in a matter of minutes.

She is seen having the ability to alter the form of her cybernetic arm into different shapes, such as a spiked mace. A razor blade or simply a regular human shaped hand. She can hyperextend her limb over great distances to broaden her reach as well.  
    
Her Deathlok cybernetics use nanite antibodies to turn any prosthetic limbs designed by SHIELD into weapons, each version more powerful than the previous. Indicating she has some technoforming abilities given how she merges with and assimilates any nearby technologies. Death Locket has grown more proficient in the use of her abilities, able to project holographic images from her right index fingertip as well as remotely sync up with wireless systems in order to control web connected technologies.

While she gained some combat experience fighting alongside the Young Masters, she is still inept at combat, and was easily bested by Hazmat.

Other versions

House of M
During the Secret Wars: battleworld event where all of reality had died in a mass Incursion event triggered by the Beyonders. What remained of the Multiverse had been condensed onto a singular planet within the greater totality which remained afterwards, Rebecca is a guerrilla freedom fighter within the Monarchy of M ruled by King Eric Magnus whom brutally enslaves and incarcerates Homo Sapians both innocent and guilty simply for being human.

Seeking to aide fellow rebels in the Human Resistance Movement Hawkeye, Black Cat and Misty Knight as the three are evading capture by S.H.I.E.L.D.'s Red Guard.

In other media
 Death Locket appears in Marvel: Avengers Alliance.
 Death Locket is also a playable character in Lego Marvel's Avengers.

References

External links
 Death Locket at Marvel Wiki
 Death Locket at Comic Vine

Characters created by Kev Walker
Comics characters introduced in 2012
Fictional amputees
Fictional cyborgs
Marvel Comics characters with superhuman strength
Marvel Comics female superheroes
Marvel Comics superheroes